Robert Fulton School is a historic school building located in the Morton neighborhood of Philadelphia, Pennsylvania.  It was designed by Irwin T. Catharine and built in 1935–1937. It is a three-story, brick and limestone building in the Moderne-style. It features ribbon bands of windows, large brick piers, a main entrance tower, and historical figures holding lamps of enlightenment and knowledge. It was named for inventor Robert Fulton.

The building was added to the National Register of Historic Places in 1986. The school was closed in 2013.

References

School buildings on the National Register of Historic Places in Philadelphia
Moderne architecture in Pennsylvania
School buildings completed in 1937
Northwest Philadelphia
Defunct schools in Pennsylvania